A boma is a livestock enclosure, community enclosure, stockade, corral, small fort or a district government office, commonly  used in many parts of the African Great Lakes region, as well as Central and Southern Africa. It is particularly associated with community decision making. 
The word originally may be from  Bantu  or  Persian, and 
it has been incorporated into many African languages, as well as colonial varieties of English, French and German.

As a livestock enclosure, a boma is the equivalent of kraal. The former term is used in areas influenced by the Swahili language, and the latter is employed in areas influenced by Afrikaans.

In the form of fortified villages or camps, bomas were commonplace in Central Africa in the 18th and 19th century. They were commonplace throughout Africa, including in areas affected by the slave trade, tribal wars and colonial conquest, and were built and used by both sides.

Apart from the neatly built stockades shown in illustrations of bomas, the term, in practice, more often resembled the structure shown in the illustration accompanying this article. In that form, they often were referred to by the likes of J. A. Hunter and Henry Morton Stanley.

Alternate use
In British colonies, especially in remote areas, boma came to be used to mean government offices because in the late 19th century such offices usually included a fortified police station or military barracks, often in the form of a timber stockade, though some had stone walls. Many were called forts, as in 'Fort Jameson', 'Fort Manning', or 'Fort Rosebery'. In the 20th century it came to mean the district or provincial government headquarters, even where fortifications were no longer required.
 
Boma is still commonly used in the African Great Lakes and Southern Africa with this meaning, along with the definition of a livestock enclosure.

Etymology and backronym 

A popular myth told to tourists in the African Great Lakes states that BOMA stood for 'British Overseas Management Administration' or 'British Officers Mess Area' during the colonial era in Africa. The myth holds that the term has since been adopted into Swahili and several other vernacular Bantu languages of former British East Africa (for example, Chichewa and Chitumbuka in Malawi) to mean government in general, or locations of governmental offices, such as district centers.

In fact, the word boma has much deeper roots in languages spoken in the Africa Great Lakes, whether as a word of Bantu origin or a loan word from Persian. The Oxford English Dictionary ascribes the first use to the adventurer Henry Morton Stanley, in his book Through the Dark Continent (1878): 'From the staked bomas..there rise to my hearing the bleating of young calves.' The term is also used throughout Stanley's earlier book How I found Livingstone(1871) '...we pitched our camp, built a boma of thorny acacia, and other tree branches, by stacking them round our camp...' Krapf's A Dictionary of the Suahili Language (1882) defines boma as 'a palisade or stockade serving as a kind of fortification to towns and villages...may consist of stones or poles, or of an impenetrable thicket of thorns,' though he does not give an origin for the word.  Boma also appears in Band's 'Deutsches Kolonial-Lexikon' (1920), which indicates the word was in use in Tanganyika long before it fell under the control of the British. Johnson's Standard Swahili-English Dictionary (1939) suggests boma comes from a Persian word, buum, which he says means 'garrison, place where one can dwell in safety.' In Swahili and Sabaki: A Linguistic History, Nurse and Hinnebusch (1993) give iboma, 'defended area,' as either a Great Lakes Bantu innovation or a borrowing from Persian (p. 295). At any rate, the word was in circulation before the British Empire began colonizing.

Moreover, no such entity as the 'British Overseas Management Administration' ever existed.  The UK Government's responsibility for the development of its colonies on a continuing basis was first recognised in 1929 by the Colonial Development Act. In 1961 a Department of Technical Co-operation was established to deal with the technical co-operation side of the aid programme.  The Ministry of Overseas Development was first set up as a separate ministry in October 1964, headed by a Minister of Overseas Development. It brought together the functions of the former Department of Technical Co-operation and the overseas aid policy functions of the Foreign, Commonwealth Relations and Colonial Offices and of other government departments.  Great Britain's bilateral aid agency was called the 'Overseas Development Administration' (ODA) from 1970 until it was renamed the Department for International Development (DFID) in 1997.

See also

 Compound (enclosure)
 Kraal
 Stockade
 Zariba

References

External links

 Swahili definition for boma in the Internet Living Swahili Dictionary
 DFID historical background

South African English
Fortifications by type
Fences
Local government
Human habitats